A statue of the Bee Gees has been erected at 109 Redcliffe Parade, Bee Gees Way, Redcliffe, Queensland, 4020 Australia. It was unveiled on 14 February 2013 by Barry Gibb, the only surviving member of the group. It was created by sculptor Phillip Piperides.

See also

 Statue of Bee Gees (Douglas, Isle of Man)

References

2013 establishments in Australia
Bee Gees
Bee Gees
Bee Gees
Redcliffe, Queensland
Bee Gees
Bee Gees
Bee Gees